Fleur de Lys is a mansion in Holmby Hills, Los Angeles, California.

Overview
Situated on five acres of land in Holmby Hills, the  property has twelve bedrooms, fifteen baths, a fifty-seat theater, a ballroom, a gym, a pool house, a  running track, a tennis court and a guest house. There is a  driveway from the gate to the main house.

The house was commissioned in 1996 and completed in 2002. It was modelled after King Louis XIV's Palace of Versailles. It was designed by architect Richardson Robertson III of Robertson Partners.

The home has 12 bedrooms, 15 bathrooms. Main entrance on Angelo drive.

Ownership
The original owners were David I. Saperstein and his wife Suzanne Saperstein. Upon their divorce in 2004, his wife received the property in the settlement. She put it on the market for US$125,000,000 (£78 million) in 2006. On March 28, 2014, the house reportedly sold to a Norwegian billionaire, close to the Fjellberg family, for US$102 million in cash, the most expensive property ever sold in Los Angeles County at the time, according to the Los Angeles Times.

See also 
 List of largest houses in the Los Angeles Metropolitan Area
 List of largest houses in the United States

References

Houses in Los Angeles
Holmby Hills, Los Angeles
Châteauesque architecture in the United States
Houses completed in 2002
2002 establishments in California